Daniel Oliver, FRS (6 February 1830, Newcastle upon Tyne – 21 December 1916) was an English botanist.

He was Librarian of the Herbarium, Royal Botanic Gardens, Kew from 1860–1890 and Keeper there from 1864–1890, and Professor of Botany at University College, London from 1861–1888.

In 1864, while at UCL, he published Lessons in Elementary Biology, based upon material left in manuscript by John Stevens Henslow, and illustrated by Henslow's daughter, Anne Henslow Barnard of Cheltenham. With a second edition in 1869 and a third in 1878 this book was reprinted until at least 1891. Oliver regarded this book as suitable for use in schools and for young people remote from the classroom and laboratory. He was elected a member of the Linnean Society, awarded their Gold Medal in 1893, and awarded a Royal Medal by the Royal Society in 1884.

He married in 1861 and was the father of two daughters and a son, Francis Wall Oliver.

In 1895, botanist Tiegh published Oliverella, a genus of flowering plants from East Africa, belonging to the family Loranthaceae and named in honour of Daniel Oliver.

He died of heart failure at his house on Kew Green on 21 December 1916.

References

External links
Daniel Oliver, Keeper of the Herbarium, Royal Gardens, Kew (1864–1890) | Art UK

1830 births
1916 deaths
Academics of University College London
English botanists
Botanists active in Kew Gardens
British pteridologists
Botanists with author abbreviations
Fellows of the Royal Society
Royal Medal winners
English librarians
Taxon authorities of Hypericum species